The African Union Convention on Preventing and Combating Corruption (AUCPCC) was adopted in Maputo on 11 July 2003 to fight rampant political corruption on the African continent. It represents regional consensus on what African states should do in the areas of prevention, criminalization, international cooperation and asset recovery. Going beyond other similar conventions, the AUCPCC calls for the eradication of corruption in the private and public sector. The Convention covers a wide range of offences including bribery (domestic or foreign), diversion of property by public officials, trading in influence, illicit enrichment, money laundering and concealment of property and primarily consists of mandatory provisions. It also obliges the signatories to introduce open and converted investigations against corruption. Those measures attracted criticism in the Journal of African Law, where Peter Schroth argued that the convention disregards other aspects of the rule of law, like e.g. data protection and the presumption of innocence.

In 2007, it was reported that the following nine countries had legal gaps relating to this Convention and United Nations Convention against Corruption.: Algeria, Burundi, Kenya, Liberia, Nigeria, Sierra Leone, South Africa, Togo, and Uganda.

As at 1 January 2020, the treaty was ratified by 43 States and signed by 49.

References

External links

Sources 

Corruption
Anti-corruption measures
Treaties concluded in 2003
Treaties entered into force in 2006
Treaties of Algeria
Treaties of Benin
Treaties of Botswana
Treaties of Burkina Faso
Treaties of Burundi
Treaties of Chad
Treaties of the Comoros
Treaties of Ivory Coast
Treaties of the Republic of the Congo
Treaties of Ethiopia
Treaties of Gabon
Treaties of the Gambia
Treaties of Ghana
Treaties of Guinea
Treaties of Guinea-Bissau
Treaties of Kenya
Treaties of the Libyan Arab Jamahiriya
Treaties of Lesotho
Treaties of Liberia
Treaties of Madagascar
Treaties of Mali
Treaties of Malawi
Treaties of Mozambique
Treaties of Namibia
Treaties of Niger
Treaties of Nigeria
Treaties of Rwanda
Treaties of the Sahrawi Arab Democratic Republic
Treaties of South Africa
Treaties of Senegal
Treaties of Seychelles
Treaties of Sierra Leone
Treaties of Tanzania
Treaties of Togo
Treaties of Uganda
Treaties of Zambia
Treaties of Zimbabwe
International development treaties
2003 in Mozambique